Eremothera is a genus of Eremobatid camel spiders, first described by Martin Hammond Muma in 1951.

Species 
, the World Solifugae Catalog accepts the following two species:

 Eremothera drachmani Muma, 1986 — Mexico
 Eremothera sculpturata Muma, 1951 — Mexico, US (Arizona)

References 

Arachnid genera
Solifugae